Fukumori (written: 福盛 or 福森) is a Japanese surname. Notable people with the surname include:

, Japanese footballer
, Japanese baseball player
, Japanese footballer
, Japanese footballer
, Japanese jazz drummer and composer

Japanese-language surnames